Wola Łużańska  is a village in the administrative district of Gmina Łużna, within Gorlice County, Lesser Poland Voivodeship, in southern Poland.

The village has a population of 996.

References

Villages in Gorlice County